Shrewsbury Rock, or sometimes "Shrewsbury Reef", is a rocky feature off the Queensland coast.

It is located between Hotspur Island and Pine Peak Island, within the Great Barrier Reef Marine Park.

The nearest major coastal town is Mackay.

External links
 

Coastline of Queensland